OtherLiine, stylised as OTHERLiiNE, is the collaborative electronic music project of duo George FitzGerald and Lil Silva (TJ Carter). They released the eponymously titled debut album OtherLiine in 2020 on Ministry of Sound.

History
Prior to collaborating as OtherLiine, FitzGerald and Silva first made contact when Silva asked FitzGerald to remix his track "Lines" (2016). Later they first worked together on the track "Roll Back" for Fitzgerald's album All That Must Be (2018).

Discography

Albums
OtherLiine (Ministry of Sound, 2020)

Singles
"Chimes" (self-released, 2019) 
"Hates Me" (Ministry of Sound, 2019)

Remixes
"Mozambique (feat. Jaykae & Moonchild Sanelly) (OtherLiine Remix)" by Ghetts

References

External links

"Producers Lil Silva and George FitzGerald join forces for an ambitious and deeply immersive new project." – interview at Wonderland

Ministry of Sound artists
English electronic music duos
English record producers